Oriental Press Group Limited is the publishing company of Hong Kong newspaper Oriental Daily News, as well as now defunct The Sun and Eastern Express. Oriental Press Group was the founding company of the magazines East Week, East Touch and Oriental Sunday, but the magazines were sold in the 2000s. Oriental Press Group, through subsidiary, operates news website on.cc. The shares of Oriental Press Group is traded in the Stock Exchange of Hong Kong.

History
Oriental Press Group Limited is incorporated on 14 January 1969 and start to publish Oriental Daily News on 22 January of the same year.

The company is listed on the Stock Exchange of Hong Kong Limited since 18 August 1987.

Products and services
Oriental Daily News is one of the major newspaper of Hong Kong. Its archrival is Apple Daily and other Chinese/Cantonese language newspapers of Hong Kong.

On top of its flagship newspaper Oriental Daily News, the company also founded The Sun in 1999 and Eastern Express. The former was published in Traditional Chinese characters while the latter was an English newspaper. Nevertheless, they were folded.

The company also founded a series of magazines that named after  (transliterated as East or Oriental): East Week,   and East Touch. All of them were sold from 2001 to 2002 to Emperor Group or Sing Tao Holdings. Some of them are still published by other companies.

The company launches the news website on.cc (at that time use the url orisun.com) in 2000. It offers the online version of Oriental Daily News under the sub domain orientaldaily.on.cc, as well as streaming video news occasionally.

Management and ownership
The company is founded by Ma Shek-chun, which Ma's son, Ma Ching-kwan, takeover the operation in 1977. Ma Shek-chun was fled to Taiwan in the 1970s as a crime suspect and was wanted by Hong Kong Police Force for over 30 years.

Ma Shek-chun two other sons, Ma Ching-fat and Ma Ching-choi, are the current chairman and vice-chairman of the company respectively.

See also
 Hong Kong Economic Times Holdings, another listed newspaper publishing company of Hong Kong
 Media Chinese International, another listed newspaper publishing company of Hong Kong and Malaysia 
 Next Digital, another listed newspaper publishing company of Hong Kong
 Sing Tao News Corporation, another listed newspaper publishing company of Hong Kong

References

External links
  

Companies listed on the Hong Kong Stock Exchange
Newspaper companies of Hong Kong
Magazine publishing companies of Hong Kong
Holding companies of Hong Kong
1969 establishments in Hong Kong
Mass media companies established in 1969